Matthew Ebden and Max Purcell defeated Ivan and Matej Sabanov in the final, 6–3, 6–3 to win the doubles tennis title at the 2022 U.S. Men's Clay Court Championships. They did not drop a set en route to their first ATP Tour doubles title as a team (also Purcell's first career ATP title overall, and Ebden's fifth).  

Santiago González and Aisam-ul-Haq Qureshi were the defending champions from when the tournament was last held in 2019, but only González chose to defend his title, partnering with Łukasz Kubot, while Qureshi competed in Marrakesh instead. González lost in the first round to Robert Galloway and Jackson Withrow.

Seeds

Draw

Draw

References

External links
 Main draw

U.S. Men's Clay Court Championships - Doubles
2022 Doubles